The following is a list of common non-native pronunciations that English speakers make when trying to speak foreign languages. Many of these are due to transfer of phonological rules from English to the new language as well as differences in grammar and syntax that they encounter.

This article uses International Phonetic Alphabet pronunciation. See Help:IPA pronunciation key and IPA chart for English for an introduction.

Esperanto 

However, since Zamenhof himself recognized this type of assimilation, there is debate over whether this is actually an error.
Speakers tend to reduce unstressed vowels.
Speakers of non-rhotic accents tend to mute the r when at end of a word or before a consonant.
Other pronunciation difficulties are related to spelling pronunciations of digraphs. The  in the digraph  is always pronounced.

German 

 One of the most difficult is German  as it is further forward in the mouth than in varieties of Standard English so that speakers may pronounce German geht as if it were English gate.
 Similarly, speakers may pronounce German  with the vowel of goat so that ohne is pronounced .
 Speakers may have trouble pronouncing German  as a clear l in positions where it is a dark l in English (that is, in the syllable coda).

Mandarin Chinese 

English speakers have difficulty with the 4 lexical tones of Mandarin Chinese.

Russian 

 Some speakers have difficulty with the trilled  in Russian, especially the palatalized  since neither are sounds of English.
 Non-rhotic speakers, even after learning the rolled-r, are prone to omit  in such Russian words as удар  ('blow') and горка  ('hillock').
 Depending on the speaker's dialect, they may have difficulty with "dark l"  (that is, velarized , which in Russian contrasts with a palatalized ) in positions other than in the syllable coda.
 Difficulty with Russian vowels:
 Most English speakers have no  (although it is an allophone in some dialects, see weak vowel merger) and speakers generally have difficulty producing the sound. They may instead produce .
 Speakers may replace  with the diphthong in day.  e.g.  instead of  дело ('affair').
 Speakers are likely to diphthongize , making сижу   ('I sit') sound more like .
 Speakers may also diphthongize  in a similar fashion, especially in open syllables.
 It is likely that speakers will make the second element of Russian diphthongs insufficiently close, making them resemble English diphthongs (e.g.,  instead of ) or pronounce it too long.
 Speakers may also have difficulty with the Russian vowel reduction system as well as other allophonic vowels.
English speakers tend to pronounce  in the pretonic position, right where  is required in Russian, while they pronounce  in pre-pretonic positions, where  occurs.
 There are no cues to indicate correct stress in Russian. Speakers must memorize where primary and secondary stress resides in each word and are likely to make mistakes.
 Speakers tend to fail to geminate double consonants.

Serbo-Croatian 

 Speakers may have a difficulty with Serbo-Croatian pitch accent and vowel length. This rarely leads to loss of intelligibility as long as the word stress is correct.
In Serbo-Croatian, vowels can be long or short in any environment; in fact, there are minimal pairs based only on length: compare grad  ('city') with grad  ('hail').
 If speakers learn to produce correct vowel length, they may diphthongize long  to  instead of the correct .
In Serbo-Croatian, vowels do not change their quality in unstressed positions.
 Voiced consonants can be only partially  rather than fully voiced .
 Similarly,  (which phonologically is an approximant and therefore not the voiced counterpart of ) can also be realized as a partially voiced fricative  instead of a fully voiced weak fricative .
 Speakers may incorrectly realize the voiceless stops  as aspirated .
 Speakers may realize  as alveolar  rather than dental .
This does not lead to loss of intelligibility as many natives merge them as well.
 Speakers who try to distinguish  from  may realize the former with inappropriate palatalization, i.e. as palato-alveolar  instead of flat postalveolar (laminal retroflex) .
 Speakers may realize  as glottal , rather than a weak velar fricative .
 The palatal sounds  may be realized as sequences .
 Instead of a trill ,  can be realized as a postalveolar approximant .

Spanish 

 "R-coloration" of vowels, especially at the end of infinitives.

See also 
 Accent reduction
 Non-native pronunciations of English

References

Bibliography 
 
 
 
 
 
 
 
 
 

Phonology
Language acquisition
Language comparison
Linguistic error